"Friendship Train" is a Grammy Award-nominated 1969 single by Gladys Knight & the Pips. It peaked at No. 17 on the Billboard Hot 100 and No. 2 on the Billboard R&B chart.

Chart performance

Cover versions
 The Temptations also recorded the song for their 1970 album Psychedelic Shack, using the same backing track as Knight's version.
 Rosetta Hightower recorded the song for her eponymous 1971 album.

References

1969 singles
1969 songs
Gladys Knight & the Pips songs
Songs written by Norman Whitfield
Songs written by Barrett Strong